Olbasa may refer to:
Olbasa (Cilicia), another name for Olba, a town of ancient Cilicia
Olbasa (Lycaonia), a town of ancient Lycaonia
Olbasa (Pisidia), a town of ancient Pisidia